Pseudaneitea is a genus of air-breathing land slugs, terrestrial gastropod molluscs in the family Athoracophoridae, the leaf-veined slugs.

Species
Species within this genus include:
 Pseudaneitea aspera Burton, 1963
 Pseudaneitea campbellensis Burton, 1963
 Pseudaneitea dendyi (Suter, 1897)
 Pseudaneitea gigantea (Suter, 1909)
 Pseudaneitea gravisulca Burton, 1963
 Pseudaneitea huttoni (Suter, 1909)
 Pseudaneitea johnsi Burton, 1963
 Pseudaneitea maculata Burton, 1963
 Pseudaneitea multistriata Burton, 1963
 Pseudaneitea pallida Climo, 1973
 Pseudaneitea papillata (Hutton, 1879)
 Pseudaneitea powelli Burton, 1963
 Pseudaneitea ramsayi Climo, 1973
 Pseudaneitea schauinslandi (Plate, 1897)
 Pseudaneitea simrothi (Suter, 1896)
 Pseudaneitea sorenseni Powell, 1955

References

Further reading 
 Powell A. W. B., New Zealand Mollusca, William Collins Publishers Ltd, Auckland, New Zealand 1979 
 NZETC

Athoracophoridae